Pedro Lomba Neto (born 9 March 2000) is a Portuguese professional footballer who plays as a winger for Premier League club Wolverhampton Wanderers and the Portugal national team.

He started his career at Braga, who loaned him to Italian club Lazio in the summer of 2017. In 2019, he signed with Wolverhampton Wanderers.

A former Portugal international at youth level, Neto made his full debut in November 2020, scoring in his first match.

Club career

Braga
Born in Viana do Castelo, Neto joined Braga's youth system at the age of 13. On 7 May 2017, whilst still a junior, he made his professional debut with their reserves, coming on as a second-half substitute in a 2–3 home loss against Porto B in the Segunda Liga. The following weekend, in his first Primeira Liga appearance with the first team, he scored after only a few minutes on the pitch, helping the hosts defeat already relegated Nacional 4–0 and becoming the club's youngest ever goal scorer in the competition.

On 31 August 2017, both Neto and teammate Bruno Jordão were loaned to Lazio of Italy for two years, with an obligation to buy both players for a combined €26 million. He only played his first match in Serie A on 27 January 2019, replacing Bastos in the last-minute of the 1–2 home loss to Juventus.

Wolverhampton Wanderers
On 2 August 2019, Neto signed with Wolverhampton Wanderers. He made his debut twelve days later in the second leg of the UEFA Europa League third qualifying round against Pyunik, scoring and providing an assist for Morgan Gibbs-White in a 4–0 home win (8–0 aggregate). His maiden appearance in the Premier League took place a few days later in the same month, when he came on for compatriot Diogo Jota late on in the 1–1 home draw with Manchester United.

Neto's first league start occurred on 28 September 2019, when he assisted Matt Doherty's opening goal in a 2–0 victory over Watford at Molineux. After having what would have been his first goal in the competition ruled out controversially by VAR at Liverpool on 29 December, he scored in the next game (a 2–1 away loss to Watford on 1 January 2020), becoming the first teenager to achieve the feat for the club in the Premier League in the process.

On 4 October 2020, Neto scored his first league goal for Wolves in the 2020–21 season in the 1–0 home defeat of Fulham. A month later, he extended his contract to 2025.

Neto was Sky Sports' player of the match in a league game with Arsenal on 29 November 2020, in which he scored once and set up Daniel Podence for his team's second goal in the game as they ran out 2–1 winners in their first away victory against that opposition since 1979. He suffered a serious knee injury in the first half of the 1–0 away defeat of Fulham on 9 April 2021, which ruled him out for the remainder of that season and the bulk of the following. He finally returned on 20 February 2022, as a second-half substitute in a 2–1 home win over Leicester City.

On 9 March 2022, Neto's 22nd birthday, he agreed to a new deal running until 2027. On 22 May, the last day of the campaign, he scored his first goal for the club since his injury, opening an eventual 3–1 loss at Liverpool in the third minute.

Neto made his 100th competitive appearance on 17 September 2022, in a 0–3 home defeat against Manchester City. The following month, he suffered an ankle injury that required surgery and sidelined him for nearly five months. He returned to action on 4 March 2023, playing the first half of the 1–0 home win over Tottenham Hotspur.

International career
On 5 September 2019, aged 19, Neto won his first cap for Portugal at under-21 level, playing the first half of a 4–0 win against Gibraltar in the 2021 UEFA European Championship qualification campaign, held in Alverca do Ribatejo. On 5 November 2020, he had his first call-up to the senior team, for matches against Andorra and France. He debuted on 11 November in a 7–0 home friendly win over the former, scored the first goal and became the first player born in the 2000s to represent the nation.

Neto was ruled out of the 2022 FIFA World Cup, due to an injury suffered with his club.

Personal life
Neto's uncle, Sérgio Lomba, was also a footballer.

Career statistics

Club

International

Portugal score listed first, score column indicates score after each Neto goal.

Honours
Lazio
Coppa Italia: 2018–19

References

External links

Portuguese League profile 

2000 births
Living people
People from Viana do Castelo
Sportspeople from Viana do Castelo District
Portuguese footballers
Association football wingers
Primeira Liga players
Liga Portugal 2 players
S.C. Braga B players
S.C. Braga players
Serie A players
S.S. Lazio players
Premier League players
Wolverhampton Wanderers F.C. players
Portugal youth international footballers
Portugal under-21 international footballers
Portugal international footballers
Portuguese expatriate footballers
Expatriate footballers in Italy
Expatriate footballers in England
Portuguese expatriate sportspeople in Italy
Portuguese expatriate sportspeople in England